Massaga is a genus of moths of the family Noctuidae. The genus was erected by Francis Walker in 1854.

Species
 Massaga angustifascia Rothschild, 1896
 Massaga hesparia Cramer, [1775]
 Massaga maritona Butler, 1868
 Massaga monteirona Butler, 1874
 Massaga noncoba Kiriakoff, 1974
 Massaga tenuifascia Hampson, 1901
 Massaga virescens Butler, 1874
 Massaga xenia Jordan, 1913

References

Agaristinae
Noctuoidea genera